The Court Marshal of Denmark (often, though incorrectly, translated as Lord Chamberlain) is Chief Administrative Officer of the Royal Household of Denmark. The Court Marshal is the chief executive of finance, staff, official duties, etc. and heads the Court Marshal's office. The Lord Marshal of the Court of Denmark (a historical superior title, which is no longer in use) has a place in the 1st Class of the Danish Order of Precedence, while the Court Marshal belong in the 2nd Class.

This role traditionally fell to the Lord Chamberlain of Denmark, but this title is no longer used, and all the responsibilities associated with the title have been allocated to the Court Marshal.

In the United Kingdom the responsibilities of the office Court Marshal roughly correspond to Lord Chamberlain (although the Danish title Overkammerherre is the correct translation for this), and the office Lord Marshal of the Court of Denmark correspond to Lord High Steward.

Court Marshals 
Until 1912, there were in periods also a Lord Marshal of the Court of Denmark, who was the superior of the Court Marshal, if one was employed at the same time. Both are listed.

References

Notes 

Danish monarchy
Noble titles
Titles
Danish court titles